This is a list of schools in Medway, in the English county of Kent.

State-funded schools

Primary schools

All Faiths' Children's Academy, Strood
All Saints CE Primary School, Chatham	
Balfour Infant School, Rochester
Balfour Junior School, Chatham
Barnsole Primary School, Gillingham
Bligh Infant school Strood
Bligh Junior School, Strood
Brompton-Westbrook Primary School, Brompton
Burnt Oak Primary School, Gillingham
Byron Primary School, Gillingham
Cedar Children's Academy, Strood
Chattenden Primary School, Chattenden
Cliffe Woods Primary School, Cliffe Woods
Crest Infant School, Rochester
Cuxton Community Infant School, Cuxton
Cuxton Community Junior School, Cuxton
Deanwood Primary School, Park Wood
Delce Academy, Rochester
Elaine Primary School, Strood
English Martyrs RC Primary School, Strood
Fairview Community Primary School, Wigmore
Featherby Infant and Nursery School, Gillingham
Featherby Junior School, Gillingham
Gordon Infant Children's Academy, Strood
Gordon Junior Children's Academy, Strood
Greenvale Primary School, Chatham
Halling Primary School, Halling
Hempstead Infant School, Hempstead
Hempstead Junior School, Hempstead
High Halstow Primary Academy, High Halstow
Hilltop Primary Academy, Frindsbury
Hoo St Werburgh Primary School, Hoo St Werburgh	
Horsted Infant School, Chatham
Horsted Junior School, Chatham
The Hundred of Hoo Academy, Hoo St Werburgh
Kingfisher Community Primary School, Walderslade
Lordswood School, Lordswood
Luton Primary School, Chatham
Maundene School, Walderslade
Miers Court Primary School, Rainham
Napier Primary Academy, Gillingham
New Horizons Children's Academy, Chatham
New Road Primary School, Chatham
Oaklands School, Walderslade
Oasis Academy Skinner Street, Gillingham
Parkwood Primary School, Rainham
Peninsula East Primary Academy, Stoke
Phoenix Primary School, Chatham
The Pilgrim CE School, Borstal
Riverside Primary School, Rainham
Rochester Riverside CE Primary School, Rochester
St Augustine of Canterbury RC Primary School, Rainham
St Benedict's RC Primary School, Lordswood
St Helen's CE Primary School, Cliffe
St James' CE Primary Academy, Isle of Grain	
St John's CE Infant School, Chatham
St Margaret's at Troy Town CE Primary School, Rochester
St Margaret's CE Junior School, Rainham
St Margaret's Infant School, Rainham
St Mary's Island CE Primary School, St Mary's Island
St Mary's RC Primary School, Gillingham
St Michael's RC Primary School, Chatham
St Nicholas CE Infant School, Strood
St Peter's Infant School, Rochester
St Thomas More RC Primary School, Chatham
St Thomas of Canterbury RC Primary School, Rainham
St William of Perth RC Primary School, Rochester
Saxon Way Primary School, Gillingham
Swingate Primary School, Lordswood
Temple Mill Primary School, Strood
Thames View Primary School, Rainham
Twydall Primary School, Gillingham
Wainscott Primary School, Wainscott
Walderslade Primary School, Walderslade
Warren Wood Primary Academy, Rochester	
Wayfield Primary School, Chatham
Woodlands Primary School, Gillingham

Non-selective secondary schools

Brompton Academy, Brompton
Greenacre Academy, Walderslade
The Howard School, Rainham
The Hundred of Hoo Academy, Hoo St Werburgh
Leigh Academy Rainham, Rainham
Maritime Academy, Strood
Rainham School for Girls, Rainham
The Robert Napier School, Gillingham
St John Fisher Catholic School, Chatham
Strood Academy, Strood
The Thomas Aveling School, Rochester
The Victory Academy, Chatham
Walderslade Girls' School, Walderslade
Waterfront UTC, Chatham

Grammar schools
Chatham Grammar School for Girls, Chatham
Fort Pitt Grammar School, Chatham
Holcombe Grammar School, Chatham
Rainham Mark Grammar School, Rainham
Rochester Grammar School, Rochester
Sir Joseph Williamson's Mathematical School, Rochester

Special and alternative schools
Abbey Court Special School, Strood
Bradfields Academy, Chatham
Danecourt School, Gillingham
Inspire Free Special School, Chatham
Rivermead School, Gillingham
The Rowans, Chatham
Will Adams Academy, Gillingham

Further education
MidKent College

Independent schools

Primary and preparatory schools
Bryony School, Rainham
St Andrew's School, Rochester

Senior and all-through schools
King's School, Rochester
Rochester Independent College, Rochester

Special and alternative schools
Blue Skies School, Chatham
City of Rochester School, Cliffe Woods
The GFC School, Gillingham
Manorway Independent School, Strood
Trinity School, Rochester

Home Education
As of 2014, 9.6% of Medway's children were home educated, though this is a likely lower than the true figure; the data relies on the number of home educated children recorded by local authorities during the 2013-2014 period (It is not compulsory for home educated children to be registered with the local authority), and the number of home educating families is increasing.

See also
University for the Creative Arts
Universities at Medway

References

Medway
Schools in Medway